The Cook ministry (Liberal) was the 9th ministry of the Government of Australia. It was led by the country's 6th Prime Minister, Joseph Cook. The Cook Ministry succeeded the Second Fisher ministry, which dissolved on 24 June 1913 following the federal election that took place in May which saw the Liberals defeat Andrew Fisher's Labor Party - albeit with a one-seat majority. The ministry was replaced by the Third Fisher ministry on 17 September 1914 following the federal election that took place on 5 September which saw Labor defeat the Commonwealth Liberals.

Willie Kelly, who died in 1960, was the last surviving member of the Cook ministry.

Ministry

References

Ministries of George V
Australian Commonwealth ministries
1913 establishments in Australia
1914 disestablishments in Australia
Cabinets established in 1913
Cabinets disestablished in 1914